Jozef Burian (21 September 1961 – 24 December 2021) was a Slovak politician. A member of Direction – Slovak Social Democracy, he served in the National Council from 2002 to 2020. He died on 24 December 2021, at the age of 60.

References

1961 births
2021 deaths
21st-century Slovak politicians
Direction – Social Democracy politicians
Members of the National Council (Slovakia) 2002-2006
Members of the National Council (Slovakia) 2006-2010
Members of the National Council (Slovakia) 2010-2012
Members of the National Council (Slovakia) 2012-2016
Members of the National Council (Slovakia) 2016-2020
Politicians from Košice